David W. Myers (born December 31, 1961) is an American politician who served as a member of the Mississippi House of Representatives from the 98th District (Pike County, Mississippi and Walthall County, Mississippi). Elected in 1995, he served until 2020.

After graduating from  McComb High School, Myers attended junior colleges and eventually received his bachelor's degree from the University of Phoenix. He is a member of Alpha Phi Alpha fraternity.

References

1961 births
Living people
Democratic Party members of the Mississippi House of Representatives
21st-century American politicians
People from Magee, Mississippi